Alexander of Aetolia, in conjunction with Dorimachus, put himself in possession of the town of Aegeira in Achaea during the Social War, in 220 BC.  But the conduct of Alexander and his associates was so insolent and rapacious, that the inhabitants of the town rose to expel the small band of the Aetolians. In the ensuing contest Alexander was killed while fighting.

Notes

References

220 BC deaths
3rd-century BC Greek people
Ancient Aetolians
Ancient Greeks killed in battle
Year of birth unknown